About Time is a 2013 British-American romantic comedy-drama film written and directed by Richard Curtis, and starring Domhnall Gleeson, Rachel McAdams, and Bill Nighy. The film is about a young man with the ability to time travel who tries to change his past in hopes of improving his future. The film was released in the United Kingdom on 4 September 2013. The film received positive reviews from critics. At the box office, it grossed $87.1 million against a $12 million budget. The film was dedicated to actor Richard Griffiths, who died a few months before the film’s release, marking his final film appearance.

Plot 
Tim Lake grows up in Cornwall, in a house by the sea with his father James, mother Mary, absent-minded uncle Desmond, and free-spirited younger sister Katherine ("Kit Kat"). On his 21st birthday, Tim learns from his father that the men of his family have the ability to travel back in time to moments they have lived before. James discourages his son from using his gift to acquire money or fame, and Tim decides he will use it to improve his love life.

The following summer, Kit Kat's friend Charlotte visits. Tim is instantly smitten, but waits until the end of her stay to tell her how he feels; she tells him that he should have told her earlier. Tim travels back in time to tell Charlotte in the middle of the holiday, but she advises him to wait until her last day. Heartbroken, Tim realises she is uninterested in him, and that time travel cannot change anyone's mind. Believing he has lost true love, Tim becomes jaded.

Tim moves to London to pursue a career as a lawyer, living with his father's acquaintance, Harry, an angry misanthropic playwright. Tim visits a Dans le Noir restaurant, where he meets Mary, an American immigrant and book publisher. They flirt in the darkness, and afterward, Mary gives Tim her phone number. Tim returns home to find a distraught Harry, whose opening night of his new play has been ruined by an actor forgetting his lines. Tim goes back in time to help the actor, and the play is a triumph.

However, when Tim tries to call Mary, he discovers that by going back in time to help Harry, the evening with Mary never occurred. He recalls Mary's obsession with Kate Moss and finds Mary a week later at a Kate Moss exhibition. However, he discovers that she now has a boyfriend. Tim goes back in time having discovered when and where they met, turning up early before the potential boyfriend arrives, and persuades Mary to leave with him instead. Their relationship develops and Tim moves in with Mary. One night, he encounters Charlotte who now seems interested in him, something Tim initially seems to consider, but turns her down upon the invitation of intimacy, realising that he is in love with Mary. He proposes; they marry and have a daughter, Posy.

Kit Kat's relationship and employment struggles lead her to drunkenly crash her car on Posy's first birthday. As Kit Kat recovers, Tim decides to intervene in her life: he prevents the crash and takes Kit Kat back in time to avert her unhappy relationship with Jimmy. They manage to return to the present, where Tim finds Posy has never been born and he has a son instead. James explains that they cannot change events prior to their children's birth and ensure that that exact child will still be conceived. Tim accepts that he cannot change his sister's life by changing her past; he allows the crash to occur, ensuring Posy's birth, and he and Mary help Kit Kat face her problems to improve her own life. She settles down with Tim's friend Jay and has a child of her own. Tim and Mary have another child, a baby boy, ensuring Kit Kat's future.

Tim learns his father has terminal lung cancer and that time travel cannot change it, as going back to remove his habitual smoking would undo his and Kit Kat's conception. His father has known for some time, traveling back in time to effectively extend his life and spend more time with his family. He tells Tim to live each day twice in order to be truly happy: first, with all the everyday tensions and worries, but the second time noticing how sweet the world can be. Tim follows this advice; his father dies, but Tim travels to the past to visit whenever he misses him.

Mary tells Tim she wants a third child. He is reluctant because it means he will not be able to visit his father again. Tim tells his father that he cannot visit anymore, and together they travel back to relive a fond memory from Tim's early childhood, taking care not to actually change the experience to avoid causing any changes to the present. Mary gives birth to a baby girl, and Tim knows he can never see his father again. Tim comes to realise that it is better to live each day once, deciding from that point on to not time travel at all, and comes to appreciate life with his family as if he is living it for the second time.

Cast 

 Domhnall Gleeson as Tim Lake
 Rachel McAdams as Mary
 Bill Nighy as James Lake
 Tom Hollander as Harry Chapman
 Lindsay Duncan as Mary Lake
 Margot Robbie as Charlotte
 Lydia Wilson as Kit Kat
 Richard Cordery as Uncle Desmond
 Joshua McGuire as Rory
 Tom Hughes as Jimmy Kincade
 Vanessa Kirby as Joanna
 Will Merrick as Jay
 Lisa Eichhorn as Mary's Mother, Jean
 Clemmie Dugdale as Ginger Jenny
 Harry Hadden-Paton as Rupert
 Mitchell Mullen as Mary's Father, Fitz
 Jenny Rainsford as Polly

Richard Griffiths and Richard E. Grant make uncredited appearances as lawyer characters in a play, with Griffiths' being his final film role.

Production 

By Curtis's own admission the conception of the idea "was a slow growth". The genesis of the idea came when Curtis was eating lunch with a friend and the subject of happiness came up. Upon admitting he was not truly happy in life, the conversation turned towards him describing an ideal day. From here Curtis realised that the day of the lunch, for him, constituted such a day, which led to him deciding to write a film about "how you achieve happiness in ordinary life". Thinking that the concept was too "simple" he decided to add a time travel element to the film.

Although the production contracted out various effect houses to try to make the time travelling effects feel like more of a spectacle, they found the resulting work "just completely wrong" tonally and instead focused on a more low-key approach. Curtis has opined "that in the end it turns out to be a kind of anti–time travel time travel movie. It uses all the time travel stuff but without it feeling like it's a science fiction thing particularly or without it feeling that time travel can actually solve your life."

Curtis is primarily known as a screenwriter, and About Time was only his third ever film as a director (plus one television short); he said the film was likely to be his last film as director, but that he will continue in the film industry.

Zooey Deschanel had been in talks for the role of Mary, but ultimately, the role went to McAdams.

Release
The film's initial release date (10 May 2013) was pushed back to 1 November 2013. It was premiered on 8 August 2013 as part of the Film4 Summer Screen outdoor cinema series at the historic Somerset House in London. It was released in the United Kingdom on 4 September 2013. It received a limited US release on 1 November, with a general release on 8 November 2013.

The film became a surprise hit in South Korea, where it was watched by more than 3 million people, one of the highest numbers among the foreign romantic comedy movies released in Korea. It grossed a total of $23,434,443 there, its highest country total.

Reception 

About Time received mixed reviews from critics. The review aggregation website Rotten Tomatoes gives the film a rating of 70%, based on 164 reviews, with an average rating of 6.36/10. The site's critical consensus reads, "Beautifully filmed and unabashedly sincere, About Time finds director Richard Curtis at his most sentimental." Metacritic, which uses a weighted average, assigned a score of 55 out of 100, based on reviews from 34 critics, indicating "mixed reviews".

Catherine Shoard of The Guardian compared the film to Groundhog Day noting it "is about as close to home as a homage can get without calling in the copyright team" and describes Domhnall Gleeson as a "ginger Hugh Grant", which "at first, is unnerving; as About Time marches on, Gleeson's innate charm gleams through and this weird disconnection becomes quite compelling."  Shoard gave the film two stars out of five. Robbie Collin of The Daily Telegraph praised the comic timing of McAdams and Gleeson, but criticised the film, comparing it to a quilt, calling it "soft, frayed at the edges, and oh so comfortable" and gives it three stars out of five.

Leslie Felperin of Variety called the film "reassuringly bland" and says there is sense of déjà vu especially for anyone who has seen The Time Traveler's Wife, also co-starring McAdams. Unlike that film, she has no knowledge of his powers in About Time, resulting in a "fundamental lack of honesty in their relationship." Felperin noted British reverse snobbery would put many off this and other Curtis films, but that this would be less of a problem among American Anglophiles and those willing to suspend disbelief, taking the characters as British "versions of Woody Allen's Manhattanites (but with less angst)". Felperin praised the chemistry of the leading couple "that keeps the film aloft" and the supporting cast, while also criticising the stock characters as being too familiar.

Dr. Caroline West said the following for Active*Consent:Oftentimes, pop culture endorses stalking behaviour in the most covert of ways – such as in the “You love me, you just don’t know it yet” subset of romantic comedies. Typically, the story goes that a non-threatening romantic hero aims to win over (or win back) his true love through the means of some slightly surrealist methods (like time travel, or 24-hour amnesia). If these films are brought down to their simplest elements, one finds a man manipulating the ‘object of his affection’ into falling for him. This is all in the pursuit of “true love” because in his mind, they are perfect for each other – she just doesn’t know it yet...Little or no focus is given to the women who are being followed and watched without their knowledge...The romantic heroines have the entire trajectory of their lives altered by the hero without their knowledge, consent or input.

Plot holes 
Critics have pointed to the film's plot holes relating to time travel; how big or how many plot holes varied with the reviewer. Kate Erbland of Film School Rejects noted: "the rules and limitations of Tim's gift aren't exactly hard and fast, and the final third of the film is rife with complications that never get quite explained. Rules that previously applied suddenly don't apply ... the time travel rules aren't exactly tight and are occasionally confusing". Megan Gibson, writing in Time magazine, said that science fiction fans would be put off by "gaping time-travel plot-holes", again suggesting that Tim's father's rules are repeatedly broken. Mark Kermode agreed that Curtis "sets up his rules of temporal engagement, only to break them willy-nilly whenever the prospect of an extra hug rears its head". Other critics who agreed include Steve Cummins of the Irish Post (the film is "riddled with plot holes"), Matthew Turner of View London (an "unsightly pile-up of plot holes and logic problems"), and Nicholas Barber from The Independent, who called the explanation of time travel "shockingly inadequate" and asserted that "Curtis keeps leaving questions unanswered – time and time again".

Soundtrack 
 Track listing

References

External links

 
 
 
 

2013 films
2013 fantasy films
2013 romantic comedy-drama films
2013 science fiction films
2010s British films
2010s English-language films
2010s fantasy comedy-drama films
2010s romantic fantasy films
2010s science fiction comedy-drama films
Alternate timeline films
British fantasy comedy-drama films
British romantic comedy-drama films
British romantic fantasy films
British science fantasy films
British science fiction comedy-drama films
British science fiction romance films
Films about father–son relationships
Films about time travel
Films directed by Richard Curtis
Films produced by Eric Fellner
Films produced by Tim Bevan
Films set in Cornwall
Films set in London
Films shot in London
Films with screenplays by Richard Curtis
Magic realism films
Relativity Media films
Working Title Films films